A war referendum is a proposed type of referendum in which citizens would decide whether a nation should go to war. No such referendum has ever taken place. The earliest idea of a war referendum came from the Marquis de Condorcet in 1793 and Immanuel Kant in 1795.

See also
Direct democracy
Ludlow Amendment

References

Immanuel Kant
Referendums by issue
Referendum
Referendum
 
Proposed referendums